Korukollu is a small village in the Kalidindi mandal of Krishna District in Andhra Pradesh, India.

Geography
The climate is tropical, with hot summers and moderate winters. The average warmest month is May.On average, the coolest month is January.The maximum average precipitation occurs in August. The peak temperature reaches  in May–June, while the winter temperature is 19-28 C. The average humidity is 78% and the average annual rainfall is 103 cm. Korukollu gets its rainfall from both the south-west monsoon and north-east monsoon.

Climate

Demographics
Population
 Total: 10500
 Male: 5000
 Female: 5500
 Householdkotha korukollus: 4500

References

External l

Ambedkar statue placed in korukollu
Villages in Krishna district